2571 Geisei, provisional designation , is a stony Florian asteroid from the inner regions of the asteroid belt, approximately 6 kilometers in diameter. It was discovered by Japanese astronomer Tsutomu Seki at Geisei Observatory on 23 October 1981, and named for the Japanese village of Geisei.

Classification and Orbit 

Geisei is a member of the Flora family, one of the largest families of stony asteroids. It orbits the Sun in the inner main-belt at a distance of 1.8–2.7 AU once every 3 years and 4 months (1,215 days). Its orbit has an eccentricity of 0.19 and an inclination of 3° with respect to the ecliptic.

The asteroid's observation arc begins 50 years prior to its discovery, with a precovery taken at Lowell Observatory in 1931.

Physical characteristics

Lightcurves 

A rotational lightcurve for this asteroid was obtained from photometric observations made at the Australian Oakley Southern Sky Observatory in September 2014. The lightcurve gave a rotation period of  hours with a brightness variation of 0.50 in magnitude.

Diameter and albedo 

According to the 2015/16 NEOWISE mission results of NASA's space-based Wide-field Infrared Survey Explorer, 
Geisei measures 5.21 and 5.23 kilometers in diameter and its surface has an albedo of 0.34 and 0.38, respectively. Preliminary WISE results gave a diameter of 6.582 kilometers and an albedo of 0.275.

The Collaborative Asteroid Lightcurve Link assumes an albedo of 0.24 – derived from 8 Flora, the largest member and namesake of the Flora family – and calculates a diameter of 6.81 kilometers using an absolute magnitude of 13.0.

Naming 

This minor planet is named after the small Japanese village of Geisei, where the discovering observatory is located. Geisei is situated near the city of Kōchi, after which Tsutomu Seki's first discovery, the asteroid 2396 Kochi, is named. The approved naming citation was published by the Minor Planet Center on 6 June 1982.

References

External links 
 Asteroid Lightcurve Database (LCDB), query form (info )
 Dictionary of Minor Planet Names, Google books
 Asteroids and comets rotation curves, CdR – Observatoire de Genève, Raoul Behrend
 Discovery Circumstances: Numbered Minor Planets (1)-(5000) – Minor Planet Center
 
 

002571
Discoveries by Tsutomu Seki
Named minor planets
19811023